James Duffy (born July 18, 1974) is an American college baseball coach and former first baseman. He had served as head coach of the Manhattan Jaspers baseball team from 2012 through 2017. He was named to that position prior to the 2012 season.

Playing career
Duffy played first base at Seton Hall where he set several school records at the plate and earned All-Big East honors three times.  He signed a professional contract with the Houston Astros in 1997.  He advanced to Class-AA, playing primarily as an outfielder, but also seeing significant time at first base.  He ended his playing career after the 1999 season.

Coaching career
While Seton Hall head coach Mike Sheppard recovered from surgery in 2001, Duffy served as a part-time assistant coach with the Pirates. He was promoted to full-time in 2003, and served as hitting coach through the 2008 season. He returned in 2011 in the same capacity before being hired at Manhattan in the summer of 2011. In his first season, the Jaspers claimed both the Metro Atlantic Athletic Conference regular season and Tournament titles, and boasted the nation's only undefeated record at home. They earned a berth in the Columbia Regional, headlined by host South Carolina.

On July 20, 2017, Duffy left his post at Manhattan to become an assistant coach at Rutgers. In 2019, head coach Joe Litterio was replaced by Steve Owens who chose not to retain Duffy on the coaching staff.

Head coaching record
This table depicts Duffy's record as a head coach at the Division I level.

References

External links

Living people
1974 births
People from Dover, New Jersey
Auburn Doubledays players
Jackson Generals (Texas League) players
Kissimmee Cobras players
Manhattan Jaspers baseball coaches
Quad City River Bandits players
Seton Hall Pirates baseball coaches
Seton Hall Pirates baseball players
Rutgers Scarlet Knights baseball coaches